The Harrison Boulevard Historic District in Boise, Idaho, includes 427 residences, an elementary school, and a church. The district is centered on Harrison Boulevard, a wide, tree lined thoroughfare with a grassy median separating north and south traffic. Harrison Boulevard extends approximately one mile from its southern beginning at West Hays Street to its northern boundary at Hill Road. The east boundary extends to Washington School at 15th and Ridenbaugh Streets, and it includes three residential properties at 15th Street, but the district narrows around Harrison Boulevard as it proceeds north. The west boundary extends as far as 20th Street at the south end of the district, and it narrows to Harrison Boulevard as the district proceeds north.

Many architectural styles are represented in the district, including Bungalow, Queen Anne, Tudor Revival, Colonial Revival, and Classical Revival. Many residences were designed by Boise's prominent architectural firms, including Tourtellotte & Co., Tourtellotte & Hummel, Wayland & Fennell, and Nisbet & Paradice. The district was added to the National Register of Historic Places in 1980.

History
President Harrison visited Boise on May 8, 1891, less than one year after Idaho had become the 43rd state. Harrison was well received, and Harrison Boulevard was named in his honor. At 100 feet, the boulevard was at the time the widest street in Boise. The newly platted Brumback Addition included the south end of Harrison Boulevard, and homesites were advertised on the boulevard during President Harrison's visit. By 1895 the Lemp Addition and the Locust Grove Addition, north of the Brumback Addition, also included Harrison Boulevard.

In 1916 Harrison Boulevard was paved and landscaped, and street lights were installed. Signs marking the Harrison Boulevard Historic District were installed in 2001 in memory of Ambrose Baltes, a former resident of the district and homeless program volunteer.

Harrison Boulevard contributing resources
A continuation sheet attached to the nomination form contains information about each of the contributing resources in the district. The list below includes the street address, year of construction, original owner, architect, and architectural style of each property if data was available. Most properties on the list include the year of construction, and some include the original owner and the architectural style. Few include the architect.

North of West Hays Street
 820 Harrison Boulevard (1911)

North of West Resseguie Street
 900 Harrison Boulevard (1905); Emulous Wallace House
 901 Harrison Boulevard (1912); R.S. Shaw House
 906 Harrison Boulevard; Colonial Revival
 907 Harrison Boulevard (1911); C.A. Carter House; Wayland & Fennell; Colonial Revival
 911 Harrison Boulevard (1940); Colonial Revival
 912 Harrison Boulevard (1940); Harry Morrison House
 915 Harrison Boulevard (1910); T.K. Little House; Nisbet & Paradice
 919 Harrison Boulevard (1921); S.E. Brookover House

North of West Ada Street
 1002 Harrison Boulevard (1925); Walter Dufresne House; Tudor Revival
 1005 Harrison Boulevard (1910)
 1009 Harrison Boulevard (1909)
 1017 Harrison Boulevard (1909); Francis Sanders House
 1020 Harrison Boulevard (1936); J.C. Jordan House
 1021 Harrison Boulevard (1909); Manford Coffin House; Tourtellotte & Co.; Bungalow

North of West Sherman Street
 1103 Harrison Boulevard (1930); Ross Cady House
 1106 Harrison Boulevard (1929); Arthur Stevens House; Bungalow
 1107 Harrison Boulevard (1937); J.D. Orr House
 1111 Harrison Boulevard (1938); R.E. Newhouse House; Tudor Revival
 1112 Harrison Boulevard (1923); Harry J. Bingham House; Colonial Revival
 1118 Harrison Boulevard (1936); J.A. Terteling House; Tudor Revival

North of West Alturas Street
 1200 Harrison Boulevard (1929); Tudor Revival
 1201 Harrison Boulevard (1913); J.W. Oakes House; Nisbet & Paradice; Georgian Revival
 1206 Harrison Boulevard (1932); Pearl Hastings House
 1210 Harrison Boulevard (1936)
 1213 Harrison Boulevard (1920); Al Kennard House; Colonial Revival
 1220 Harrison Boulevard (1936); Colonial Revival
 1221 Harrison Boulevard (1938); R.S. Smith House; Colonial Revival

North of West Eastman Street
 1304 Harrison Boulevard (1901); John Myer House; Queen Anne
 1305 Harrison Boulevard (1905); Eugene Looney House; Tourtellotte & Co.; Queen Anne
 1311 Harrison Boulevard (1936)
 1312 Harrison Boulevard (1923)
 1315 Harrison Boulevard (1939); Colonial Revival
 1316 Harrison Boulevard (1912); Colonial Revival

North of West Brumback Street
 1402 Harrison Boulevard (1937); Tudor Revival
 1403 Harrison Boulevard (1908); Arthur Golden House; Colonial Revival
 1406 Harrison Boulevard (1938); Tudor Revival
 1409 Harrison Boulevard (1908); Harry C. Wyman House; Tourtellotte & Co.
 1410 Harrison Boulevard (1911); Bungalow
 1415 Harrison Boulevard (1919); Colonial Revival
 1420 Harrison Boulevard (1910); S.J. Loupe House

North of West Ridenbaugh Street
 1500 Harrison Boulevard (1940); Colonial Revival
 1505 Harrison Boulevard (1911); G.W. Bond House; Tourtellotte & Hummel; Mission Revival
 1509 Harrison Boulevard (1910)
 1510 Harrison Boulevard (1941); Colonial Revival
 1516 Harrison Boulevard (1930); Tudor Revival
 1519 Harrison Boulevard (1907); Robert Nourse House

North of West Lemp Street
 1601 Harrison Boulevard (1920); J.H. Richards House; Wayland & Fennell; Colonial Revival
 1602 Harrison Boulevard (1910); W.E. Leitner House
 1605 Harrison Boulevard (1937)
 1609 Harrison Boulevard (1908); Henry Compton House
 1610 Harrison Boulevard (1937); Tudor Revival
 1615 Harrison Boulevard (1925)
 1619 Harrison Boulevard (1928); Colonial Revival
 1620 Harrison Boulevard (1910); Mary Nutt House

North of West Heron Street
 1700 Harrison Boulevard (1937); Tudor Revival
 1701 Harrison Boulevard (1923); Ira E. High House; Bungalow
 1704 Harrison Boulevard (1915)
 1706 Harrison Boulevard (1905); John P. Anderson House
 1707 Harrison Boulevard (1920); H.K. Fritchman House (second); Bungalow
 1711 Harrison Boulevard (1936); Tudor Revival
 1714 Harrison Boulevard (1905)
 1717 Harrison Boulevard (1936); Claude R. High House; Moderne
 1718 Harrison Boulevard (1908)

North of West Hazel Street
 1800 Harrison Boulevard (1921); Bungalow
 1801 Harrison Boulevard (1940); A. Anderson House; Hans Hulbe; Colonial Revival
 1806 Harrison Boulevard (1922)
 1812 Harrison Boulevard (1919); E.C. Daughlin House; Bungalow
 1820 Harrison Boulevard (1921); Bungalow

North of West Bella Street
 1901 Harrison Boulevard (1920); Bungalow
 1903 Harrison Boulevard (1916); Bungalow
 1907 Harrison Boulevard (1916); Bungalow
 1911 Harrison Boulevard (1909); Bungalow
 1910 Harrison Boulevard (1922); Bungalow
 1912 Harrison Boulevard (1911); Bungalow
 1915 Harrison Boulevard (1923)
 1919 Harrison Boulevard (1923); J.R. Courtney House; Bungalow
 1920 Harrison Boulevard (1930); Tudor Revival

North of West Irene Street
 2001 Harrison Boulevard (1921); B.J. Bradley House; Bungalow
 2004 Harrison Boulevard (1910)
 2009 Harrison Boulevard (1910); Omer W. Allen House; Bungalow
 2010 Harrison Boulevard (1941); Colonial Revival
 2014 Harrison Boulevard (1914); Charles Spinner House
 2016 Harrison Boulevard (1910); Bungalow
 2017 Harrison Boulevard (1930)
 2020 Harrison Boulevard (1926)
 2021 Harrison Boulevard (1906)
 2025 Harrison Boulevard (1940); Tudor Revival
 2026 Harrison Boulevard (1910); Queen Anne
 2030 Harrison Boulevard (1912)
 2036 Harrison Boulevard (1938)
 2037 Harrison Boulevard (1937)
 2040 Harrison Boulevard (1937); Colonial Revival
 2041 Harrison Boulevard (1937); Colonial Revival

North of West Dewey Street
 2101 Harrison Boulevard (1920); Bungalow
 2106 Harrison Boulevard (1909); Joseph and Mary Rose House
 2108 Harrison Boulevard (1920); Ezekiel Sweet House; Bungalow
 2111 Harrison Boulevard (1909); Thomas Hamilton House
 2114 Harrison Boulevard (1910); Bungalow

North of West Dora Street
 2200 Harrison Boulevard (1910); Byron J. Wilson House
 2201 Harrison Boulevard (1942)
 2203 Harrison Boulevard (1940); John Cornell House; Tudor Revival
 2206 Harrison Boulevard (1903); John B. Archibal House

North 15th Street
 1101 N 15th St (1905)
 1403 N 15th St (1903); Queen Anne
 1419 N 15th St (1921); Bungalow
 1607 N 15th St (1912); Washington School; designed by Boise High School students

North 16th Street

North of West Resseguie Street
 900 N 16th St (1905); L.M. Bumpas House; Queen Anne
 901 N 16th St (1906); Bungalow
 904 N 16th St (1906)
 905 N 16th St (1905)
 909 N 16th St (1908); Calvin Starling House
 910 N 16th St (1906)
 914 N 16th St (1904)
 917 N 16th St (1907); Ella Baxter House; Queen Anne
 918 N 16th St (1920); Bungalow

North of West Ada Street
 1001 N 16th St (1907); C.C. Abernathy House; C.E. Ward; Bungalow
 1003 N 16th St (1912); Bungalow
 1004-1006 N 16th St (1921); Leda B. Goux Bungalows
 1008 N 16th St (1910); Bungalow
 1011 N 16th St (1905); Queen Anne
 1014 N 16th St (1906)
 1015 N 16th St (1906)
 1019 N 16th St (1908); Glenn Shawhan House

North of West Sherman Street
 1101 N 16th St (1920); Bungalow
 1102 N 16th St (1904); Gardner G. Adams House
 1107 N 16th St (1912); Guy Stanets House; Bungalow
 1108 N 16th St (1908); Queen Anne
 1109 N 16th St (1909); Queen Anne
 1112 N 16th St (1911)
 1113 N 16th St (1905); Charles and Maude Bassett House
 1119 N 16th St (1908); James Wylie House

North of West Alturas Street
 1201 N 16th St (1904); Queen Anne
 1202 N 16th St (1906)
 1208 N 16th St (1905)
 1209 N 16th St (1905);Newton Irish House
 1210 N 16th St (1906); Mary Goff House
 1211 N 16th St (1910); Albert Redd House
 1212 N 16th St (1904)
 1213 N 16th St (1909); Harvey Bostwick House
 1215 N 16th St (1910)
 1217 N 16th St (1920); Charles Yerrington House; Bungalow
 1220 N 16th St (1900)

North of West Eastman Street
 1301 N 16th St (1906); Lewis Heaston House; Queen Anne
 1304 N 16th St (1904); Guy Matthews House; Queen Anne
 1307 N 16th St (1900); F.C. Smith House; J.W. Smith
 1310 N 16th St (1904)
 1314 N 16th St (1903)
 1315 N 16th St (1908); Queen Anne
 1318 N 16th St (1898); Lou Harris House
 1319 N 16th St (1908); George Cole House; Queen Anne

North of West Ridenbaugh Street
 1501 N 16th St (1940); Bungalow
 1509 N 16th St (1927); Bungalow
 1511 N 16th St (1924); Bungalow
 1515 N 16th St (1923); Bungalow
 1519 N 16th St (1904); Queen Anne

North of West Lemp Street
 1601 N 16th St (1902)
 1604 N 16th St (1910); James and Lizzie Hanley House
 1607 N 16th St (1901)
 1609 N 16th St (1911)
 1612 N 16th St (1912); Harriet Lane House
 1613 N 16th St (1922); Bungalow
 1615 N 16th St (1903)
 1619 N 16th St (1904); John F. Green House
 1620 N 16th St (1940); Colonial Revival

North of West Heron Street
 1702 N 16th St (1905); Augusta Wootan House
 1703 N 16th St (1903); William O'Neill House; Queen Anne
 1706 N 16th St (1905); Etta and David Kimsey House
 1710 N 16th St (1907); Earl Holmstead House
 1711 N 16th St (1907)
 1713 N 16th St (1905); Thomas Moore House
 1715 N 16th St (1905); L.C. Heffner House
 1717 N 16th St (1907); Joseph Monroe House

North 17th Street

North of West Franklin Street
 709-711 N 17th St (1940); Moderne
 713-715 N 17th St (1935); Moderne

North of West Resseguie Street
 801 N 17th St (1909)
 805 N 17th St (1911); Bungalow
 806 N 17th St (1921); Bungalow
 807 N 17th St (1910); Bungalow
 808 N 17th St (1920); Bungalow
 809 N 17th St (1910); Bungalow
 812 N 17th St (1920); Bungalow
 819 N 17th St (1912); Bungalow
 820 N 17th St; Bungalow

North of West Ada Street
 901 N 17th St (1909); Queen Anne
 906 N 17th St (1930); John Perrault House; Tudor Revival
 907 N 17th St; Bungalow, Queen Anne
 909 N 17th St (1921); Colonial Revival
 910 N 17th St (1910); Bungalow
 912 N 17th St (1913); Bungalow
 915 N 17th St (1921); Colonial Revival
 919 N 17th St (1908)

North of West Sherman Street
 1001 N 17th St (1914); Bungalow
 1004 N 17th St (1911)
 1006 N 17th St (1920); Bungalow
 1010 N 17th St (1910)
 1011 N 17th St (1907)
 1015 N 17th St (1910)
 1019 N 17th St (1912)
 1020 N 17th St (1922); Colonial Revival

North of West Alturas Street
 1101 N 17th St (1922); Colonial Revival, Bungalow
 1102 N 17th St (1923)
 1110 N 17th St (1910)
 1111 N 17th St (1910)
 1115 N 17th St (1911); Bungalow
 1118 N 17th St (1908); Winfield and Lillian Hyde House
 1121 N 17th St (1932); Tudor Revival

North of West Eastman Street
 1201 N 17th St (1923); Bungalow
 1205 N 17th St (1915)
 1209 N 17th St (1901)
 1210 N 17th St (1938); Colonial Revival
 1213 N 17th St (1905); Queen Anne
 1218 N 17th St (1938); Colonial Revival
 1219 N 17th St (1901)

North of West Brumback Street
 1301 N 17th St (1909); Bungalow
 1302 N 17th St (1935); Tudor Revival
 1305 N 17th St (1916); Bungalow
 1309 N 17th St (1926); Bungalow
 1312 N 17th St (1922); Bungalow
 1313 N 17th St (1928)
 1317 N 17th St (1908); Walter Hulick House; Bungalow

North of West Irene Street
 1901 N 17th St (1898) 1700 Irene St; Frank Foster House
 1908 N 17th St (1906); Jesse Dressler House
 1912 N 17th St (1906)
 1913 N 17th St (1920); Bungalow
 1915 N 17th St (1907); Queen Anne
 1918 N 17th St (1908)
 1919 N 17th St (1904); Queen Anne
 1920 N 17th St (1905); Queen Anne
 1923 N 17th St (1911); Bungalow
 1924 N 17th St (1911); Bungalow
 1930 N 17th St (1906)
 1934 N 17th St (1910)
 1938 N 17th St (1908); Benjamin Frank Orr House
 1944 N 17th St (1908); Queen Anne

North of West Dewey Street
 2001 N 17th St (1899); George Vaughn House; John E. Tourtellotte; Queen Anne
 2002 N 17th St (1905)

North 18th Street

North of West Washington Street
 617 N 18th St (1913); W.B. Hartman House
 621 N 18th St (1912)
 703 N 18th St (1909)
 704 N 18th St (1912)

North of West Resseguie Street
 801 N 18th St (1921); Bungalow
 802 N 18th St (1922); F.H. Roseboom House; Bungalow
 805 N 18th St (1921); Bungalow
 808 N 18th St (1931); Tudor Revival
 809 N 18th St (1910); Queen Anne
 814 N 18th St (1933); Tudor Revival
 815 N 18th St (1926); Tudor Revival
 818 N 18th St (1907)
 819 N 18th St (1928); Tudor Revival

North of West Ada Street
 901 N 18th St (1921); Bungalow
 902 N 18th St (1935); Tudor Revival
 905 N 18th St (1910); George Schaff House
 906 N 18th St (1929); Tudor Revival
 908 N 18th St (1914); Bungalow
 911 N 18th St (1910); Queen Anne
 912 N 18th St (1934)
 915 N 18th St (1914); Bungalow
 918 N 18th St (1935)
 919 N 18th St (1933); Tudor Revival

North of West Sherman Street
 1001 N 18th St (1910); John Leonard House
 1002 N 18th St (1921); Colonial Revival
 1004 N 18th St (1929); Mission Revival
 1007 N 18th St (1910); Bungalow
 1012 N 18th St (1912); Dorothy Hook House; Colonial Revival
 1013 N 18th St (1919); Bungalow
 1014 N 18th St (1938); Tudor Revival
 1015 N 18th St (1937)
 1018 N 18th St (1940); Clayne Robinson House; Tudor Revival
 1019 N 18th St (1938); Colonial Revival

North of West Alturas Street
 1101 N 18th St (1935); Tudor Revival
 1102 N 18th St (1914); G.W. Bond House (second); Tourtellotte & Hummel; Bungalow
 1104 N 18th St (1914)
 1107 N 18th St (1913); Bungalow
 1111 N 18th St (1940)
 1115 N 18th St (1910)
 1116 N 18th St (1928); Tudor Revival

North of West Eastman Street
 1202 N 18th St (1905)
 1212 N 18th St (1905)
 1215 N 18th St (1911); W.E. Leitner House (second)
 1220 N 18th St (1907)
 1226 N 18th St (1902)

North of West Brumback Street
 1301 N 18th St (1910); Bungalow
 1302 N 18th St (1911); A.E. Ihrig House; Bungalow
 1304 N 18th St (1911); A.E. Ihrig House (second); Bungalow
 1307 N 18th St (1916); A.E. Woodman House (second); Bungalow
 1308 N 18th St (1911); A.E. Ihrig House (third); Bungalow
 1314 N 18th St (1911)

North of West Ridenbaugh Street
 1401 N 18th St (1906); Queen Anne

North of West Irene Street
 1902 N 18th St (1910); Queen Anne

North 19th Street

North of West Resseguie Street
 701 N 19th St (1929)
 706 N 19th St (1919); Bungalow
 707 N 19th St (1910)
 710 N 19th St (1911); Tudor Revival
 711 N 19th St (1911); Colonial Revival
 714 N 19th St (1921); Bungalow
 720 N 19th St (1911); Queen Anne

North of West Ada Street
 801 N 19th St (1910)
 802 N 19th St (1922)
 805 N 19th St (1910); Bungalow
 806 N 19th St (1922); Bungalow
 809 N 19th St (1923); William Antrim House
 810 N 19th St (1922); Colonial Revival
 816 N 19th St (1908); J.R. Compton House
 817 N 19th St (1911)
 819 N 19th St (1911)

North of West Sherman Street
 901 N 19th St (1911); David Newman House; Bungalow
 902 N 19th St (1911); Silas Burnham House; Bungalow
 905 N 19th St (1911); Bungalow
 906 N 19th St (1910); Bungalow
 909 N 19th St (1910); Bungalow
 910 N 19th St (1911)
 915 N 19th St (1911)
 916 N 19th St (1910); Bungalow
 918 N 19th St (1922); Bungalow
 919 N 19th St (1922); Bungalow

North of West Alturas Street
 1001 N 19th St (1911)
 1002 N 19th St (1911); Hezekiah and Lucy Saunders House (second)
 1003 N 19th St (1914)
 1004 N 19th St (1910)
 1009 N 19th St (1928)
 1012 N 19th St (1911); Bungalow
 1015 N 19th St (1910); Alfred Lee House
 1016 N 19th St (1908)

North of West Eastman Street
 1101 N 19th St (1923); Bungalow
 1102 N 19th St (1911)
 1106 N 19th St (1910); A.H. Bain House; Bungalow
 1107 N 19th St (1912); J.P. Taylor House; Bungalow
 1110 N 19th St (1910); Bungalow
 1115 N 19th St (1911); Bungalow
 1116 N 19th St (1941); Lyle Ferney House
 1117 N 19th St (1910); Willie A. White House

North 20th Street

North of West Washington Street
 603 N 20th St (1908); Lars S. Honstead House
 616 N 20th St (1911); A.E. Woodman House

North of West Resseguie Street
 702 N 20th St; Tudor Revival
 706 N 20th St (1911)
 708 N 20th St (1927); Bungalow
 709 N 20th St (1921); Bungalow
 710 N 20th St (1911); C.K. Denman House
 711 N 20th St (1913); Bungalow
 713 N 20th St (1922); Robert Mowbray Davidson House; Colonial Revival
 718 N 20th St (1909); Robert Bears House

North of West Ada Street
 801 N 20th St (1908); Henry and Mary Vernon House

Named streets

West Hays Street
 1609 W Hays St (1921)
 1615 W Hays St (1909)
 1619 W Hays St (1909)
 1621 W Hays St (1904); William Hitson House; Queen Anne

West Resseguie Street
 1605 W Resseguie St (1910); James Slick House
 1607 W Resseguie St (1910)
 1609 W Resseguie St (1911)
 1611 W Resseguie St (1907); Queen Anne
 1660-1666 W Resseguie St (1935); Colonial Revival
 1701 W Resseguie St (1911)
 1705 W Resseguie St (1912)
 1707 W Resseguie St (1912)
 1711 W Resseguie St (1911); Bungalow
 1713 W Resseguie St (1909); Hezekiah Saunders House
 1715 W Resseguie St (1912); Bungalow
 1811 W Resseguie St (1910); Bungalow
 1817 W Resseguie St (1911); Colonial Revival
 1818 W Resseguie St (1940)
 1820 W Resseguie St (1935); Colonial Revival
 1903 W Resseguie St (1928); Tudor Revival
 1915 W Resseguie St (1914)

West Ada Street
 1670 W Ada St (1915); Colonial Revival
 1715 W Ada St (1907)

West Sherman Street
 1529 W Sherman St (1921); R.S. Coolbaugh House

West Alturas Street
 1521 W Alturas St (1911)
 1661 W Alturas St (1921)

West Eastman Street
 1661 W Eastman St (1916); Bungalow
 1665 W Eastman St (1921)
 1717 W Eastman St (1901)
 1723 W Eastman St (1911); Former United Presbyterian Church
 1803 W Eastman St (1904); Andrew McQuaid House; Bungalow
 1804 W Eastman St (1900); John and Carrie Pilmer House; Queen Anne
 1817 W Eastman St (1898); Francis Leonard House

West Brumback Street
 1817 W Brumback St (1903); Harmon Cox House
 1901 W Brumback St (1921); Otis Hon House

West Ridenbaugh Street
 1702 W Ridenbaugh St (1900); J.M. Campbell House
 1711 W Ridenbaugh St (1911); Bungalow
 1724 W Ridenbaugh St (1904); Queen Anne
 1801 W Ridenbaugh St (1904); Thomas Bennett House
 1810 W Ridenbaugh St (1938)

West Lemp Street
 1611 W Lemp St (1913)

West Hazel Street
 1511 W Hazel St (1910)

West Irene Street
 1662 W Irene St (1938)
 1710 W Irene St (1920)

West Dewey Street
 1661 W Dewey St (1928)

References

External links

		
National Register of Historic Places in Boise, Idaho
Historic districts on the National Register of Historic Places in Idaho
Bungalow architecture in Idaho
Queen Anne architecture in Idaho
Tudor Revival architecture in Idaho
Colonial Revival architecture in Idaho